The Christchurch School of Music (CSM) is a music school in Christchurch, New Zealand.

The school was founded in 1955 by Robert Perks to provide musical education to primary school children. The CSM now provides lessons for people of all ages, and for a large range of orchestral instruments.
The CSM features several orchestras, concert bands, and other instrumental groups, and performs a Showcase Concert each year in which all CSM students participate.

There are many groups at CSM which  provide musical knowledge to the youth of Christchurch. These groups include the Junior Symphony Orchestra, Intermediate Symphony Orchestra, Sinfonia Orchestra, CSM recorder group, as well as private lessons.

The Christchurch Youth Orchestra, plays several concerts each year in the ChristChurch Cathedral, and goes on a tour at the end of each year to places like Australia.

External links
 Christchurch School of Music website

References

Music schools in New Zealand
Education in Christchurch
Culture in Christchurch